The Natural Edge Project (TNEP) is an independent think-tank for sustainability based in Australia. TNEP contributes to leading research, case studies, tools, policies and strategies for achieving sustainable development across government and business. The non-profit TNEP receives mentoring and support from selected experts and leading organisations in Australia and internationally.  TNEP delivers short courses, workshops, and conference presentations to build industry experience and relationships. It has published the books Natural Capitalism by Amory Lovins (1999), described as "groundbreaking" by Habitat Australia, and The Natural Advantage of Nations edited by Karlson Hargroves and Michael H Smith (2005). The patron of TNEP is Sir Ninian Stephen, former Governor General of Australia.

The Natural Edge Project was the winner of the 2005 Banksia Award for Environmental Leadership Education and Training.  The Banksia Awards aims to recognise individuals and organisations for environmental excellence and innovation.

See also
Factor 5: Transforming the Global Economy through 80% Increase in Resource Productivity

References

External links
The Natural Edge Project

Environmental organisations based in Australia